IOT or IoT may refer to:

 British Indian Ocean Territory, ISO 3166-1 alpha-3 code
 Internet of things, connecting everyday objects to the internet
 Illuminates of Thanateros, an international magical organization
 Inductive output tube, a variety of vacuum tube
 Institute of Transportation, an agency in Taiwan
 Input-Output Transfer, instructions for the PDP-8
 Completed operations indicator, in Belgian railway signalling

See also
 Indian Ocean Territory (disambiguation)